Rotem is a biblical desert shrub, and it may refer to:

People
 David Rotem, Israeli politician
 J. R. Rotem, American record producer
 Simcha Rotem, one of the heads of the Warsaw Ghetto Uprising
 Yuval Rotem, Israeli diplomat
 Rotem Erlich (born 1969), Israeli basketball player
 Rotem Gafinovitz, Israeli road cyclist
 Rotem Kowner, Israeli historian and psychologist
 Rotem Or, known as Totemo, Israeli musician and producer
 Rotem Sela, Israeli actress, model, and television host

Other uses
 Rotem, the Hebrew name (רותם) for the genus of flowering bushes Retama
 Rotem (medicine), rotational thromboelastometry; test of blood coagulation
 Rotem, Bik'at HaYarden, an Israeli settlement in the West Bank
 Rotem Crisis, a 1960 confrontation between Israel and the United Arab Republic
 Hyundai Rotem, part of the Hyundai Kia Automotive Group
 IAI Rotem L, an Israeli unmanned aerial vehicle

See also